32. Gün was a Turkish national and international television news show. Launched in 1985 by Mehmet Ali Birand, it was Turkey's longest-running and one of the most influential news programmes. The show was originally aired on state-owned TRT 1 (1985–1992), then moved on to private television channels.

Contributors to 32. Gün include: Coşkun Aral, Mithat Bereket, Ali Kırca, Cenk Başlamış, Ahmet Sever, Bülent Çaplı, Rıdvan Akar, Cüneyt Özdemir, Can Dündar, Çiğdem Anad, Deniz Arman, Ayfer Dedekorkut, Serdar Akinan, Kerem Şenel, Utku Başar and Günel Cantak.

Books
 Mehmet Ali Birand (2005), 20 Yılın Perde Arkası: 32. Gün (Backstage of 20 Years: 32. Gün), Doğan Kitap

References

1985 Turkish television series debuts
Television news shows
Turkish television series
1980s Turkish television series
1990s Turkish television series
2000s Turkish television series
2010s Turkish television series
Turkish Radio and Television Corporation original programming
ATV (Turkey) original programming
Show TV original programming
Kanal D original programming